The 2019 Stetson Hatters football team represents Stetson University during the 2019 NCAA Division I FCS football season. They are led by seventh-year head coach Roger Hughes and play their home games at Spec Martin Stadium. They are members of the Pioneer Football League.

Previous season
The Hatters finished the 2018 season 8–2, 6–2 in PFL play to finish in a tie for second place.

Preseason

Preseason coaches' poll
The Pioneer League released their preseason coaches' poll on July 30, 2019. The Hatters were picked to finish in sixth place.

Preseason All–PFL teams
The Hatters had eight players selected to the preseason all–PFL teams.

Offense

First team

Donald Parham – TE

Andrew Rogalski – OL

Second team

Colin McGovern – QB

Steven Burdette – WR

Jareem Westcott – RB

James McCammon – OL

Defense

First team

Colby Duncan – LB

Second team

JJ Henderson – DB

Schedule

Game summaries

Louisiana College

at Marist

Western New England

North Carolina Wesleyan

Butler

Dayton

at Valparaiso

at Jacksonville

San Diego

Davidson

at Morehead State

References

Stetson
Stetson Hatters football seasons
Stetson Hatters football